The Wales Green Party is a semi-autonomous political party within the Green Party of England and Wales (GPEW). It covers Wales, and is the only regional party with semi-autonomous status within the GPEW. The Wales Green Party puts up candidates for council, Senedd, and UK Parliament seats.

Organisation, leadership and representation

The Wales Green Party elects a Spokesperson and two Deputy Spokespeople every 2 years, as well as electing council members on an annual basis to make day to day decisions between AGMs. All elected roles in the Wales Green Party are voluntary. The current Leader of the Wales Green Party is Anthony Slaughter, with Helen Westhead and Amerjit Kaur-Dhaliwal as Co-Deputy Leaders. Wales-wide decisions are taken by the Wales Green Party Council which is composed of the spokespeople, elected officers, and a representative from each local party.

As of 2018, the Wales Green Party is represented internally within the GPEW by Louise Davies and Kathryn Driscoll, on the Green Party Regional Council (GPRC).

The Wales Green Party's Amelia Womack served as the Deputy Leader of the Green Party of England and Wales from September 2014 to September 2022.

Leadership history 
Pippa Bartolotti became Wales Green party leader in January 2012. She stood (unsuccessfully) for the leadership of the GPEW later that year. After four years of leadership, Bartolotti decided against standing for a further term as leader in the 2015 Leadership election which was won by Alice Hooker-Stroud, while Hannah Pudner became deputy leader. Alice was then re-elected in 2016 along with Grenville Ham and a returning Pippa Bartolotti as deputy leaders. Alice resigned in 2017 stating that her position had become "untenable" due to the voluntary nature of the role.
Alice was succeeded in early 2017 by Grenville Ham. Grenville defected to Plaid Cymru in late 2018 citing the party's vote to remain a part of the Green Party of England and Wales rather than to become an independent party (as the Scottish Greens had previously done) as his reason. Like Alice, Grenville described his position as "untenable". Mirka Virtanen was elected deputy leader in 2016 to begin in 2017, replacing Pippa Bartolotti, and Benjamin Smith was co-opted to the vacant deputy leader role in July 2017.

Anthony Slaughter (former deputy leader) was named the current leader of the Wales Green Party in December 2018, beating Mirka Virtanen (deputy leader at the time) and Alex Harris in the leadership election. Duncan Rees was elected deputy leader. Mirka was co-opted back into the deputy leader role until December 2019. Lauren James was selected to replace her in April 2020.

Membership 

As of July 2018, the Wales Green Party had around 1,500 members. By the end of 2019, the Green Party in England and Wales had a combined 49,013 members (up from 38,707 in 2018).

History

Pre-1990 

The Green Parties in the United Kingdom have their roots in the PEOPLE Party which was founded in 1972, which became the Ecology Party in 1975, and then the Green Party in 1985.

In 1973, three Welsh Green candidates (P. Jones, W. Jones and V. Carney) won seats in the inaugural Welsh district council elections in the Gadlys and Town wards on Cynon Valley Borough Council.  The party narrowly missed out on a fourth seat to the Labour Party.

Early years (1990s) 

In 1990, the Scottish and Northern Irish branches left the UK Greens to form separate parties. The English and Welsh parties became the Green Party of England and Wales, with the Welsh branch being semi-autonomous.

In 1991, Marcus Hughes and Brian Stringer were elected to represent the Bynea and Dafen wards on Llanelli Borough Council In 1995, both then stood unsuccessfully as 'Independent Green' candidates, losing their seats to Labour on the new Carmarthenshire County Council. In 1993, the Party won a county council seat on Ynys Mon after a sitting councillor in the Aethwy ward had joined the Greens, but the Party did not defend this seat or stand any other candidates at the 1995 Isle of Anglesey County Council election two years later.

At the 1992 general election, local Greens entered an electoral alliance with Plaid Cymru in the constituency of Ceredigion and Pembroke North. The alliance was successful with Cynog Dafis being returned in a surprise result as the MP, defeating the Liberal Democrat incumbent by over 3,000 votes. The agreement broke down by 1995 following disagreement within the Welsh Green Party over endorsing another party's candidate, though Dafis would go on to serve in parliament as a Plaid Cymru member until 2000, and in the National Assembly for Wales from 1999 until 2003. Dafis later stated that he did not consider himself to be the "first Green MP".

On 29 August 1997, the Wales Green Party issued a joint declaration with the Liberal Democrats and Plaid Cymru, supporting the 'Yes for Wales' campaign and the establishment of a new National Assembly for Wales in the 1997 Welsh devolution referendum.

Devolution (1999–present) 

In the 1999 Welsh local elections, Klaus Armstrong-Braun became the first Green Party councillor to be elected to one of Wales' twenty two unitary councils, winning a seat on Flintshire County Council. In 2006, the party elected Ann Were as party leader, the first female leader of a Welsh political party.

In 2010, the party became the only Green party within the United Kingdom to have not elected a Green candidate to a UK or devolved legislature, after Caroline Lucas was elected to the UK Parliament. In 2011, the Green Party campaigned in support of a yes vote in the 2011 Welsh devolution referendum. In 2013, the Wales Green Party archive at the National Library was damaged in a fire with some historical material either destroyed or permanently damaged.

In 2015, the Party agreed to support as many powers for Wales as possible, 'up to and including independence'. In the 2017 Welsh local elections, the Wales Green Party had their first county councillor elected to Powys County Council, for the Llangors ward.

In July 2018 the party held a vote on whether to split from the GPEW to form a separate organisation. Of those members who voted, 65% voted against the proposal, despite the leader Grenville Ham campaigning for independence. In October 2020, party members voted that they would campaign to support Welsh independence if a referendum was called on the matter, with party leader Anthony Slaughter arguing that many green policies could not be implemented in Wales without further devolved powers or independence.

In September 2021, Matt Townsend called for the party to become independent from its Westminster counterpart, despite members voting against it three years earlier. Writing in Bright Green, Townsend pointed out that the Scottish and Northern Irish Green parties were both independent from the GPEW. "This has left Wales as one of very few nations around the world to not have its own Green Party," he said. Townsend also noted that whilst the Scottish Greens had now entered government with the SNP, the Wales Green Party failed to win any seats at the 2021 Senedd election.

Policies

While associated mainly with environmentalist policies, the party has a history of support for communitarian economic policies, including well-funded, locally controlled public services within the confines of a steady-state economy, is supportive of proportional representation voting systems and takes a progressive approach to social policies, including supporting a universal basic income and transitioning to a four day working week. It also supports the devolution of further powers to Wales as part of a long term vision which advocates Welsh independence. In October 2020, the party announced that it would campaign for Welsh independence should a referendum be held.

The party is strongly opposed to nuclear power and radioactive waste, with an emphasis instead on expanding localised renewable energy projects. Other policies within Policies for a Sustainable Society in Wales include phasing out waste incineration, improving public transport and supporting new safestanding areas in Welsh sports stadiums. Also included within the party’s policies is the commitment to "bring the rail system, including track and operators, back into public ownership".

The Green Party support ending the role of the monarchy as an office of government and giving members of the royal family the same civil rights and tax obligations as other citizens.

Wales Young Greens

Wales Young Greens is the youth and student 'local group' of the Young Greens of England and Wales.

The current co chairs of the Young Greens of England and Wales are Kelsey Trevett and Jane baston.

Welsh Green Pride

Welsh Green Pride is the LGBTIQA+ Liberation group within the Wales Green Party which runs alongside but separate to the GPEW group LGBTIQA+ Greens. Its current Spokesperson is Ash Jones, and it has two deputy spokespeople Mike Whittall and Michael Cope. The group started a UK wide review of the discriminatory blood ban 'which excludes any LGBTIQ+ (Lesbian, Gay, Bisexual, Trans, Intersex & Queer) people who have had sexual relations in the past 12 months from donating blood'.

Electoral performance

Local elections

 Figures do not include community or town councils.

Senedd

UK Parliament

Police and Crime Commissioners

The party did not field candidates in the 2012, 2016 or  2021 police and crime commissioner elections in Wales.

European Parliament (1994–2019)

Election campaigns

Local elections

2022 

The 2021 Welsh local elections were postponed until 2022 to avoid a clash with the 2021 Senedd election, with the future electoral cycle also changed from four to five years by the Welsh Government. The Wales Green Party formed an electoral pact with Plaid Cymru to fight seats in Cardiff.

The party won eight seats in the election, exceeding a previous high of three seats held in the early 1990s (prior to the two tier system of county and district councils being abolished and replaced by twenty two new unitary councils in 1995). A further two were elected via an alliance with Plaid Cymru in Cardiff.

Senedd

2021 

The Green Party stood a full set of regional list candidates as well as thirteen constituency candidates in the 2021 Senedd election.

Some of the party's key policies for the 2021 Senedd election include: ending fees for people's first university degree, targeting Wales to be carbon net zero by 2030 by replacing fossil fuels with onshore and offshore renewable energy, and introducing free public transport for local journeys for people in Wales aged under 21. The party also said it would build 12,000 homes to the highest environmental standards and would start a transformation fund to invest in local communities and create thousands of green jobs.

During the campaign it was initially announced the party would be excluded from taking part in the BBC One Wales leaders debate scheduled for 29 April 2021. However, BBC Wales later announced that a revised format would allow the party to participate in the second half of the TV debate.

 Regional list 

 Constituencies

2016 

In September 2015, Amelia Womack, Deputy Leader of GPEW, announced her intention to stand in the National Assembly elections for Wales Green Party. An ITV article titled "Green deputy leader wants to switch to Welsh politics" wrote of Newport-born Womack's intention to stand in the Welsh elections saying; "She's seeking the nomination for the Cardiff Central constituency and – more significantly – hoping to be top of the Wales Green Party's regional list for South Wales Central." Notably the article went on to say "Opinion polls have occasionally suggested that the Greens could gain a list seat in the Senedd".

10 February 2016 Welsh Greens abandoned progressive alliance negotiations a few months before the Senedd elections.  The manifesto included plans to scrap the M4 relief road, build 12,000 new homes a year and provide free childcare to every child in Wales.

 Regional list 

 Constituencies 

 DNS = Did not stand.

2011
The Wales Green Party again fielded candidates in all 5 top-up regions for the 2011 election. For the first time since 1999, the Greens also stood in a constituency - they once again opted to stand in Ceredigion.

During the 2011 campaign, they specifically targeted Labour voters with the aim of persuading them to use their regional list vote for the Greens, using the slogan "2nd vote Green". They claimed that Labour list votes were "wasted" and that over 70,000 votes in South Wales Central went "in the bin at every election" as Labour had never won a top-up seat in that region.

On this occasion, South Wales Central was the region the party targeted. The region includes Cardiff, with its large student population, and also the constituency of Cardiff Central, the only Liberal Democrat-Labour marginal seat in Wales. Welsh Green leader and South Wales Central candidate Jake Griffiths stated they were also aiming to attract disaffected Liberal Democrat voters in the region.

The Greens polled 32,649 votes, 3.4% of the total votes cast for the regional lists. In South Wales Central, they took over 10,000 votes, 5.2% of the total, though they were still almost 6,000 votes away from winning a seat. The regional results were as follows:

In Ceredigion, Chris Simpson polled 1,514 votes, or 5.2%. He came fifth out of five candidates.

2007
In 2007, the party again fielded a list of candidates in each of the top-up regions but no candidates for the constituencies. The Wales Green Party proposed that Wales should "be at the forefront of....a green industrial revolution". The party targeted South Wales West - the region where they had performed best in 2003.

The Welsh Greens polled 33,803 votes, or 3.5% of the total, a slight decrease on 2003. The party failed to win any seats, with their best performance this time being Mid and West Wales with 4.0% of the vote. In South Wales West their vote declined by one percentage point, their worst result of the five regions.

2003
In the 2003 election, the party again fielded a list of candidates for each of the electoral regions but this time stood no candidates for the constituencies. The Welsh Greens failed to win any seats, polling 30,028 votes, or 3.5%. Their best performance was in South Wales West where they polled 6,696 votes, or 4.8% of the total.

1999
In the 1999 inaugural election for the National Assembly, the Welsh Greens stood candidates in all five electoral regions used to elect "top-up" members of the assembly. Additionally, one candidate stood for the constituency seat of Ceredigion. The party stated that they aimed to poll around 7% of the vote and win at least one top-up seat.

The Welsh Greens ultimately polled 25,858 votes in the regional lists, 2.5% of the total, and 1,002 constituency votes (3.1%) in Ceredigion. No Welsh Greens were elected.

UK Parliament

2019 

The Wales Green Party entered an electoral pact in eleven Welsh seats with Plaid Cymru and the Welsh Liberal Democrats, as part of the Remain Alliance. As a result of this agreement, the party did not contest ten Welsh seats and instead supported pro-European Plaid Cymru or Liberal Democrat candidates.  In the Vale of Glamorgan constituency, Anthony Slaughter stood for the Green Party as the Remain Alliance candidate but was not elected.  The 2019 manifesto was titled If not now, when? and included various commitments, including taxing frequent flyers, creating more energy-efficient homes, decommissioning North Sea oil rigs and phasing out the UK’s coal industry.

2017

2015 

The Wales Green Party fielded their highest number of UK general election candidates and achieved their best UK election result in Wales.

References

External links
Wales Green Party (Official website)

Green Party of England and Wales
Green Party, Wales
Organisations based in Cardiff